TAEC is an acronym that can stand for 

Tanzania Atomic Energy Commission, a regulatory and service parastatal organization of Tanzania
Toshiba America Electronic Components, a US branch of Toshiba
The Australian Events Centre, an events centre based in Essendon Fields, Victoria, Australia
 Technology Associates EC INC, a wireless telecommunications consulting firm - Corporate headquarters, Carlsbad, CA
 Traditional Arts and Ethnology Centre, a museum in Luang Prabang, Lao PDR